James Murdock may refer to:

James Murdock (scholar) (1776–1856), American scholar
James Murdock (politician) (1871–1949), Canadian politician
James Murdock (actor) (1931–1981), American actor

See also
James Murdoch (disambiguation)